The Giraffe Centre is located in Lang'ata, approximately  from the centre of Nairobi, Kenya. It was established in order to protect the vulnerable giraffe, that is found only in the grasslands of East Africa.

In 1979, the Giraffe Center, a nature sanctuary for visiting and including wildlife conservation education for urban school children, was started by Jock Leslie Melville, the Kenyan grandson of a Scottish Earl, when he and his wife Betty captured two baby giraffe to start a programme of breeding giraffe on their Langata property, site of the present Centre.  Since then the programme has had huge success, resulting in the introduction of several breeding pairs of Rothschild Giraffe into Kenyan national parks.

By 1983 enough money had been raised to establish the Giraffe Visitor's Center as a tourist destination just outside Nairobi.

The main attraction for both school children and visitors is feeding giraffes from a raised observation platform. The Giraffe Center is also home to several warthogs which freely roam the area along with the giraffes.

Notes

Further reading

External links

Tourist attractions in Nairobi
Zoos in Kenya
Zoos established in 1983